Condylocardiidae is a family of small marine bivalve clams of the order Carditida.

Genera
 Benthocardiella Powell, 1930
 Carditella E. A. Smith, 1881     
 Carditopsis E. A. Smith, 1881
 Condylocardia Bernard, 1896 
 Condylocuna Iredale, 1896     
 Cuna Hedley, 1902

References
 
 Powell A. W. B., New Zealand Mollusca, William Collins Publishers Ltd, Auckland, New Zealand 1979 

 
Bivalve families
Taxa named by Jean-Baptiste Lamarck